The 1987 SCCA Coors RaceTruck Challenge season was the inaugural season of the SCCA RaceTruck Challenge.

Race calendar and results

Final standings

References

1987 in American motorsport